Neil W. Garrod is a British academic.

He has published in the fields of mathematical programming, accounting, financial analysis and higher education policy (Challenging Boundaries, 2010). He graduated from the University of Manchester Institute of Science and Technology (UMIST) with a B.Sc. in Management Sciences and a Ph.D. In Operations Research. He has held lecturing posts in the University of Wales, Aberystwyth; Union College, Schenectady, New York; University of Wales, Bangor; University of Glasgow, Scotland.

He was Dean of the Faculty of Law and Financial Studies at the University of Glasgow before taking the position of Executive Dean of the Faculty of Commerce, Law and Management at the University of the Witwatersrand in Johannesburg, South Africa. He has held Deputy Vice-Chancellor positions at Thames Valley University and the University of Greenwich as well as Executive Director of Enterprise and Civic Engagement at Glyndwr University and was Director of the Higher Colleges of Technology (HCT) in Al Ain in the United Arab Emirates. He is currently Deputy Vice-Chancellor at the Central University of Technology, Bloemfontein, South Africa.

Run
In 2001 he ran from Rome to Glasgow as part of the celebrations of the 550th anniversary of the establishment of the University of Glasgow by papal bull. He ran for 64 consecutive days averaging a marathon a day.

References

External links
http://www.neilgarrod.net

21st-century British mathematicians
Living people
Year of birth missing (living people)
Alumni of the University of Manchester Institute of Science and Technology
Academics of Aberystwyth University
Union College (New York) faculty
Academics of Bangor University
Academics of the University of Glasgow
Academic staff of the University of the Witwatersrand